Gol Qeshlaq or Golqeshlaq may refer to:
 Gol Qeshlaq, Ardabil
 Gol Qeshlaq, Kurdistan